Gavin Gordon (24 November 190118 November 1970) was a Scottish bass singer, actor and composer, best known for his 1935 Hogarthian ballet The Rake's Progress.

Biography
Gavin Gordon was born in Ayr, Scotland in 1901, as Gavin Muspratt Gordon Brown. He went to Rugby School then studied music at the Royal College of Music in London under Ralph Vaughan Williams and other teachers.

His ballets A Toothsome Morsel (1930), Regatta (1931), The Death of Hector and The Scorpions of Ysit (1932) did not remain in the repertory.  More lasting fame, however, was accorded to The Rake's Progress (1935), based on the sequence of seven pictures by William Hogarth known as A Rake's Progress. His ballet suite Les Noces Imaginaires has been issued on a Heritage label CD, played by the BBC Concert Orchestra, conducted  by Barry Wordsworth.

Gavin Gordon also wrote some orchestral works, including parodies of old-style dances such as Four Caricatures and Work in E major.  There is also music for a musical based on Dick Whittington, and incidental music for the play The Man Behind the Statue, based on Simón Bolívar, written by Peter Ustinov and directed by Robert Donat.

As a singer, he appeared in the stage production of My Fair Lady.

Gavin Gordon died in London in 1970, aged 68.

References

<https://www.heritage-records.com/shop/orchestral/heritage-orchestral/british-celebration-2/>

Sources
 Grove's Dictionary of Music and Musicians, 5th ed, 1954
 Bruce R. Schueneman, William Emmett Studwell: Minor ballet composers: biographical sketches of sixty-six underappreciated composers

1901 births
1970 deaths
Scottish composers
British ballet composers
Scottish basses
Operatic basses
Scottish male film actors
Alumni of the Royal College of Music
People educated at Rugby School
20th-century Scottish male actors
20th-century Scottish male opera singers
20th-century British composers
20th-century Scottish musicians